Gotland County  is a constituency of the Riksdag, currently electing 2 of its 349 members.

Results

2022

2018

References

Riksdag constituencies
Gotland County